Charles Bolzinger (born 14 December 2000) is a French handball player for Montpellier Handball and the French national team.

References

2000 births
Living people
French male handball players
Montpellier Handball players